A Short Film About Wong Kar Wai is a 2015 Turkish short film directed and written by Ömer Çapoğlu and Serdar Önal.

Synopsis
Harun has suddenly been abandoned by his long-time girlfriend, whom he wanted to marry. While wandering around, he comes across a street film seller called Erhan. Erhan is a person who aims to make people happy with his films and change their perspective on life. Impressed by the Wong Kar-wai movies (such as Chungking Express, In the Mood for Love, 2046 and Happy Together) given to him by Erhan, Harun begins acting like the characters in the movies and starts applying some of the scenes from the movies to his daily life.

Cast
 Ahmet Rıfat Şungar as Harun
 Cihat Duman as Filmseller
 Elanur Zunun
 Eylem Kaptan
 Sureyya Guzel
 Nuran Ozkan
 Mehmet Can Kaya
 Cemil Demirtas
 Burak Ebren
 Mehmet Ugurkul
 Hazal Ulukurt
 Levent Salih Gülec
 Bahadir Yilmaz

External links 
 
 

2015 short films
Turkish short films
2010s Turkish-language films
2015 comedy-drama films
Turkish comedy-drama films